Alan Henry (9 June 1947 – 3 March 2016) was a British Grand Prix reporter and book author.

Career
Henry had been a Grand Prix reporter since the early 1970s. He was the Formula One correspondent of The Guardian newspaper and until the end of 2012, he was Grand Prix editor of Autocar magazine; he was the Editor at Large of F1 Racing magazine. Henry was also the chief editor of the yearly Autocourse Formula One season review books, a position he had held since 1988, and he wrote a weekly blog for the McLaren team's website, mclaren.com. Additionally, Henry authored more than 50 motorsport-related books and won the 1984 Pierre Dreyfus award from the Guild of Motoring Writers for his book Ferrari: The Grand Prix Cars (1985).

Personal life

Henry lived in rural Essex with his wife and family. He died on 3 March 2016 after an illness.

Publications 

Partial list

References 

1947 births
2016 deaths
Formula One journalists and reporters
Historians of motorsport
British motoring journalists